New York's 100th State Assembly district is one of the 150 districts in the New York State Assembly. It has been represented by Aileen Gunther since 2003, succeeding her late husband, Jake Gunther III.

Geography
District 100 consists of a majority of Sullivan County and a portion of northern Orange County.

Recent election results

2022

2020

2018

2016

2014

2012

References 

100
Orange County, New York
Sullivan County, New York